Dylan Ainsworth (born November 19, 1992) is a Canadian football defensive lineman who is currently a member of the BC Lions of the Canadian Football League (CFL). Ainsworth was drafted by the Saskatchewan Roughriders (CFL) in the second round of the 2014 CFL Draft. He played CIS football at the University of Western Ontario, where he held the single season sack record of 9.5 sacks, and attended South Delta Secondary School in Tsawwassen, British Columbia.

College career
Ainsworth played three seasons for the Western Ontario Mustangs. He earned CIS Second Team All-Canadian honours in 2013.

Professional career

Saskatchewan Roughriders 
Ainsworth was drafted by the Saskatchewan Roughriders of the CFL with the eleventh overall pick in the 2014 CFL Draft. Ainsworth played 35 games in his first two seasons in the CFL, playing mostly on special teams. He contributed 29 special teams tackles and 1 defensive tackle. He was re-signed by the Riders in February 2016 on a one-year contract, but he missed the entire 2016 season after suffering an injury in training camp. On January 27, 2017, about two weeks before becoming a free agent, Ainsworth was released by the Riders along with three of his teammates.

BC Lions 
On February 10, 2017, Ainsworth was signed by the BC Lions of the CFL. Ainsworth, a native of Vancouver, returned home to care for his father who is suffering from multiple myeloma, a form of bone marrow cancer.

References

External links
 Canadian Football League profile
 
 
 Western Mustangs profile
 South Delta Sun Devils bio

Living people
1992 births
Players of Canadian football from British Columbia
Canadian football defensive linemen
Western Mustangs football players
Saskatchewan Roughriders players
People from Delta, British Columbia